The 2017 season is Hougang United's 20th consecutive season in the top flight of Singapore football and in the S.League. Along with the S.League, the club will also compete in the Prime League, the Singapore Cup and the Singapore League Cup.

Squad

Sleague

Prime league

Transfers

Pre-season transfers

In

Out

Trial

Mid-season transfers

Out

Friendlies

Pre-season friendlies

In-season friendlies

Coaching staff

Team statistics

Appearances and goals

Competitions

Overview

S.League

Singapore Cup

Preliminary round

Quarter-final

Hougang United won 8-1 on aggregate

Semi-final

Hougang United lost 4-3 on aggregate

3rd/4th place

Singapore TNP League Cup

Group matches

References

Hougang United FC seasons
Singaporean football clubs 2017 season